Édison Fernando Vega Obando (born 8 March 1990) is an Ecuadorian footballer who plays for Aucas.

Club career
Vega began playing football with Imbabura. He joined Deportivo Quito in 2012. In 2015 he played for Barcelona SC.

He joined L.D.U. Quito in 2016.

International career
He made his international debut for the Ecuador national football team in a 2-0 victory over Jamaica on September 7, 2018.

Honours
LDU Quito
Ecuadorian Serie A: 2018
Copa Ecuador: 2019
Supercopa Ecuador: 2020

Aucas
Ecuadorian Serie A: 2022

References

1990 births
Living people
Association football midfielders
Ecuadorian footballers
Ecuador international footballers
Ecuadorian Serie A players
Imbabura S.C. footballers
S.D. Quito footballers
Barcelona S.C. footballers
L.D.U. Quito footballers
People from Ibarra, Ecuador